Bob Grant was born at Hammersmith and educated at Aldenham School. After National Service as a 2nd Lieutenant with the Royal Artillery he trained at the Preparatory Academy to the Royal Academy of Dramatic Art, Highgate, London. He entered show business as a standup comic, playing the halls from Chelsea Palace to the Glasgow Empire. He played in repertory at York, Horsham, High Wycombe, Leicester, Oxford and Scarborough and toured with many productions including Big Soft Nellie and Charley's Aunt. He played Kitely in the Theatre Workshop production of Ben Jonson's Every Man in His Humour both at Stratford and the Théâtre SarahBernhardt, Paris, for the 1960 Fourth International Season of the Theatre of the Nations Festival. He was awarded the best supporting performance at the festival by the Young Critics Circle.

On the London stage he appeared in Blitz! at the Adelphi, Sparrows Can't Sing at Wyndham's and Mrs. Wilson's Diary at the Criterion, and Houses By The Green at the Royal Court. He wrote and directed Instant Marriage at the Piccadilly, and appeared in No Time for Sergeants at Her Majesty's, the latter on both radio and television. He played the part of George Brown in Mrs. Wilson's Diary for London Weekend Television, and appeared in Z-Cars, Softly, Softly, and The Borderers for the BBC.

He was best known for his role as Jack Harper in On the Buses for Independent Television, appearing in all 74 episodes, and as a writer with Stephen Lewis for a number of episodes from series 5 onwards. He reprised the Jack Harper role for the three On the Buses''' feature films that followed the series. He performed in many radio plays for the BBC and also wrote and performed The FrostyFresh Man for BBC Radio 4 and ABC Radio Canberra. In the latter part of his career, he spent much of his time writing plays in collaboration with Anthony Marriott. In the 1990s, he became wellknown to Pitlochry Festival Theatre audiences with appearances in The Little Foxes, The Cherry Orchard, A Month of Sundays, Spider's Web, and Death of a Salesman''.

Stage credits

As actor
This table contains Grant's known professional theatrical roles. It also contains the occasions when he both acted and directed, and on one occasion, designed the set. It does not contain those productions where he was a director but did not appear on stage. Note, as of October 2020, roles prior to 1954 are incomplete.

As director
This table contains Grant's stage work as a director. It does not include those productions in which he also appeared, which are shown in the table above.

Radio plays
Grant took part in many radio broadcasts in his career, including interviews, poetry readings and talks about the theatre and acting. The following is a list of plays in which he was involved.

Recordings

Film

Television
The following is a list of television programmes in which Grant was involved.

Awards and honours

Publications

See also

Footnotes

References

Bibliography

Radio Times Genome Project

Books and journals

Theatre programmes

Websites

Media

Newspapers

Aberdeen Evening Express

Arab Times

Birmingham Daily Gazette

Birmingham Daily Post

Buckinghamshire Examiner

The Canberra Times

Cheshire Observer

Coventry Evening Telegraph

Daily Mirror

The Daily Telegraph

The Illustrated London News

The Independent

Kent & Sussex Courier

Lichfield Mercury

Middlesex County Times

Newcastle Evening Chronicle

Newcastle Journal

Perthshire Advertiser

Reading Evening Post

Sandwell Evening Mail

The Singapore Business Times

The Stage

Staines & Ashford News

The Sun

The Tatler

The Times

West Sussex County Times

Further reading

External links

British filmographies
Male actor filmographies